Canada Beef is a trade and marketing organization. The organization was formerly known as the Beef Information Centre.

History
In 2008 the BIC teamed up with the Canadian Cattlemen's Association and the Canadian Pork Council to disseminate information at the height of the WTO trade dispute over the mandatory country-of-origin labeling (mCOOL) rules.

The beef export trade of Canada was the world’s eighth biggest in 2013, with annual shipments of $22.9bn. 

The beef industry was, at least in 2015, the largest sector of the Canadian food manufacturing industry. 

Canada Beef funded the Canadian Beef Centre of Excellence in Calgary, Alberta. The Centre was opened in March 2015 after a nine-month construction. It serves as a marketing and food education centre, with a demonstration kitchen, a full-HACCP "fabrication room" and broadcast capabilities.

In July 2019, Canada Beef received a $5.3 million subsidy from the Trudeau government "in order to grow sales internationally, in part by boosting foreign consumer confidence in Canada’s product."

Leadership
In July 2019, Michael Young was president of Canada Beef.

Funding
The organization is funded by virtue of the Canadian Beef Cattle Check-Off.

See also
 List of food industry trade associations

References

External link
Canadian Beef

Food industry trade groups
Trade associations based in Canada
Meat processing in Canada
Agricultural organizations based in Canada
Meat industry organizations